The Dayton Gems were a minor professional ice hockey team based in Dayton, Ohio, in the Central Hockey League. The team was originally a member of the International Hockey League before it merged into the CHL in 2010. The team played their home games at the Hara Arena in nearby Trotwood.

History
The team was established in 2009 and joined the International Hockey League (IHL) for the 2009–10 season. The team was named after the original Dayton Gems of the former International Hockey League. Their acceptance into the IHL was officially announced on June 9, 2009. On June 15, 2009, the Gems named John Marks as head coach.

On December 2, 2009, the IHL Board of Governors announced that it had terminated the ownership group of the Dayton Gems and had taken ownership of the team while new local ownership group is pursued. The Dayton Gems were taken over by a local ownership group GDHP, LLC, led by Rob Garfield, in January 2010. The other two owners were Kathy Rupp and Dr. Paul Nitz. On April 23, the Gems owners announced that John Marks was fired as head coach after one season.

On June 1, 2010, the International Hockey League announced that they were joining the Central Hockey League (CHL). On July 7, the Gems announced that Brian Gratz would be the new head coach and general manager. On July 19, the 2010–11 Dayton Gems jerseys were revealed after they were voted on by the fans, as well as the first ten players signed for the season.

On May 17, 2012, the Dayton Gems ceased operations. The Gems were replaced by the Dayton Demonz of the Federal Hockey League for the 2012–13 season.

Season records

Playoff record

References

2009 establishments in Ohio
2012 disestablishments in Ohio
Defunct Central Hockey League teams
Defunct ice hockey teams in Ohio
Ice hockey teams in Dayton, Ohio
Ice hockey clubs established in 2009
International Hockey League (2007–2010) teams
Sports clubs disestablished in 2012